Kráľova Lehota is a village and municipality in Liptovský Mikuláš District in the Žilina Region of northern Slovakia.

History
In historical records the village was first mentioned in 1361.

Geography
The municipality lies at an altitude of 677 metres and covers an area of 19.609 km². It has a population of about 634 people.

Genealogical resources

The records for genealogical research are available at the state archive "Statny Archiv in Bytca, Slovakia"

 Roman Catholic church records (births/marriages/deaths): 1675-1923 (parish B)
 Lutheran church records (births/marriages/deaths): 1784-1897 (parish A)

See also
 List of municipalities and towns in Slovakia

External links
https://web.archive.org/web/20080111223415/http://www.statistics.sk/mosmis/eng/run.html 
http://www.kralovalehota.sk (added by Andrej Hyben)
http://www.seas.sk/?ide=888 Pumped Storage Power Plant Čierny Váh
 Surnames of living people in Kralova Lehota

Villages and municipalities in Liptovský Mikuláš District